The 2021 Wheelchair Rugby League World Cup was the fourth staging of the Wheelchair Rugby League World Cup, and was one of three major tournaments part of the 2021 Rugby League World Cup. The tournament was held in England from 3 November to 18 November 2022. It was originally planned to be held in November 2021 but was postponed due to the COVID-19 pandemic in England. It was the first occasion on which the wheelchair rugby league competition took place concurrently with the men's and women's tournaments.  The competition was also the first time that participants in the wheelchair tournament received the same participation fees as players in the other competitions and the first time that prize money was awarded.

The tournament was won by England who beat France 28–24 in the final on 18 November 2022.

Teams

Qualification
England, as hosts, and France, as holders of the world cup were given automatic entry to the competition. Other nations were invited to submit entries and six were chosen against a range of criteria including current international and domestic infrastructure and plans for growth.  The six nations selected to join England and France in the tournament are Australia, Norway, Scotland, Spain, United States and Wales. Norway was replaced by Ireland due to the former being unable to prepare sufficiently for the tournament due to COVID-19 pandemic related issues.

Draw
The teams were drawn into two groups of four. The two seeded teams were England (Group A) and France (Group B). The draw was made at Buckingham Palace on 16 January 2020.  Teams from pool 1 were drawn by Prince Harry, Duke of Sussex, pool 2 was drawn by Katherine Grainger and pool 3 by Jason Robinson. Norway was replaced by Ireland after the draw. The fixtures were announced on 21 July 2020.  All the games in the tournament weree played as double headers.

Squads

Each nation named 12-player squads to compete in the tournament.

Venues

Stadium locations
The tournament was played at three venues, the Copper Box Arena in London was used for the Group A games, the English Institute of Sport, Sheffield hosted the Group B games as well as both semi-finals. These venues were confirmed when the revised schedule for the tournament was issued. The final was scheduled for the M&S Bank Arena in Liverpool but the postponement of the tournament from 2021 to 2022 resulted in a venue change with the final played in Manchester at Manchester Central.

Team base camp locations
Two locations were used by the national squads to stay and train before and during the World Cup tournament;
 London: Australia, England, Norway and Spain
 Sheffield: France, Scotland, United States and Wales

Officiating
The match officials for the tournament were announced on 5 October 2022.
  David Butler (England)
  David Roig (France)
  Grant Jackson (Wales)
  Kim Abel (Wales)
  Laurent Abrial (France)
  Matthew Ball (England)
  Ollie Cruickshank (Scotland)
  Steven Hewson (Australia)

Warm-up matches

Group stage

Group A
All six matches in group A were played at Copper Box Arena in London.

Group B
All six matches in group B were played at English Institute of Sport in Sheffield.

Knockout stage

Semi-finals
Both semi-finals were played at English Institute of Sport in Sheffield.

Final

The final was played at Manchester Central Convention Complex in Manchester, the day before the men's and women's finals.

See also
 2021 Men's Rugby League World Cup
 2021 Women's Rugby League World Cup
 Legacy of the 2021 Rugby League World Cup

Notes

References

External links

 

2021 Rugby League World Cup
Wheelchair Rugby League World Cup
Rugby League World Cup
Rugby League World Cup
Rugby League World Cup
Wheelchair Rugby League World Cup
Wheelchair rugby league